In geometric topology, McShane's identity for a once punctured torus  with a complete, finite-volume hyperbolic structure is given by

where
 the sum is over all simple closed geodesics γ on the torus; and
 ℓ(γ) denotes the hyperbolic length of γ.
This identity was generalized by Maryam Mirzakhani on her PhD thesis

References

Necessary and Sufficient Conditions for McShane's Identity and Variations Ser Peow Tan, Yan Loi Wong, and Ying Zhang eprint arXiv:math/0411184 
McShane, G.  Simple geodesics and a series constant over Teichmuller space. Invent. Math. 132 (1998), no. 3, 607–632.

Geometric topology